Pathogenic bacteria are bacteria that can cause disease. This article focuses on the bacteria that are pathogenic to humans. Most species of bacteria are harmless and are often beneficial but others can cause infectious diseases. The number of these pathogenic species in humans is estimated to be fewer than a hundred. By contrast, several thousand species are part of the gut flora present in the digestive tract.

The body is continually exposed to many species of bacteria, including beneficial commensals, which grow on the skin and mucous membranes, and saprophytes, which grow mainly in the soil and in decaying matter. The blood and tissue fluids contain nutrients sufficient to sustain the growth of many bacteria. The body has  defence mechanisms that enable it  to resist microbial invasion of its tissues and give it a natural immunity or innate resistance against many microorganisms.

Pathogenic bacteria are specially adapted and endowed with mechanisms for overcoming the normal body defences, and can invade parts of the body, such as the blood, where bacteria are not normally found. Some pathogens invade only the surface epithelium, skin or mucous membrane, but many travel more deeply, spreading through the tissues and disseminating by the lymphatic and blood streams. In some rare cases a pathogenic microbe can infect an entirely healthy person, but infection usually occurs only if the body's defence mechanisms are damaged by some local trauma or an underlying debilitating disease, such as wounding, intoxication, chilling, fatigue, and malnutrition. In many cases, it is important to differentiate infection and colonization, which is when the bacteria are causing little or no harm.

Caused by Mycobacterium tuberculosis bacteria, one of the diseases with the highest disease burden is tuberculosis, which killed 1.4 million people in 2019, mostly in sub-Saharan Africa. Pathogenic bacteria contribute to other globally important diseases, such as pneumonia, which can be caused by bacteria such as Staphylococcus,  Streptococcus and Pseudomonas, and foodborne illnesses, which can be caused by bacteria such as Shigella, Campylobacter, and Salmonella. Pathogenic bacteria also cause infections such as tetanus, typhoid fever, diphtheria, syphilis, and leprosy.

Pathogenic bacteria are also the cause of high infant mortality rates in developing countries. A GBD study estimated the global death rates from (33) bacterial pathogens, finding such infections contributed to one in 8 deaths (or ~7.7 million deaths), which  the second largest cause of death globally in 2019.

Most pathogenic bacteria can be grown in cultures and identified by Gram stain and other methods. Bacteria grown in this way are often tested to find which antibiotics will be an effective treatment for the infection. For hitherto unknown pathogens, Koch's postulates are the standard to establish a causative relationship between a microbe and a disease.

Diseases

Each species has specific effect and causes symptoms in people who are infected. Some people who are infected with a pathogenic bacteria do not have symptoms. Immunocompromised individuals are more susceptible to pathogenic bacteria.

Pathogenic susceptibility
Some pathogenic bacteria cause disease under certain conditions, such as entry through the skin via a cut, through sexual activity or through a compromised immune function.

Some species of Streptococcus and Staphylococcus are part of the normal skin microbiota and typically reside on healthy skin or in the nasopharangeal region. Yet these species can potentially initiate skin infections. Streptoccal infections include sepsis, pneumonia, and meningitis. These infections can become serious creating a systemic inflammatory response resulting in massive vasodilation, shock, and death.

Other bacteria are opportunistic pathogens and cause disease mainly in people with immunosuppression or cystic fibrosis. Examples of these opportunistic pathogens include Pseudomonas aeruginosa, Burkholderia cenocepacia, and Mycobacterium avium.

Intracellular
Obligate intracellular parasites (e.g. Chlamydophila, Ehrlichia, Rickettsia) have the ability to only grow and replicate inside other cells. Even these intracellular infections may be asymptomatic, requiring an incubation period. An example of this is Rickettsia which causes typhus.  Another causes Rocky Mountain spotted fever.

Chlamydia are intracellular parasites. These pathogens can cause pneumonia or urinary tract infection and may be involved in coronary heart disease.

Other groups of intracellular bacterial pathogens include Salmonella, Neisseria, Brucella, Mycobacterium, Nocardia, Listeria, Francisella, Legionella, and Yersinia pestis. These can exist intracellularly, but can exist outside of host cells.

Infections in specific tissue
Bacterial pathogens often cause infection in specific areas of the body.  Others are generalists.
 Bacterial vaginosis is a condition of the vaginal microbiota in which an excessive growth of Gardnerella vaginalis and other mostly anaerobic bacteria displace the beneficial  Lactobacilli species that maintain healthy vaginal microbial populations.
 Bacterial meningitis is a bacterial inflammation of the meninges, which are the protective membranes covering the brain and spinal cord.
 Bacterial pneumonia is a bacterial infection of the lungs.
 Urinary tract infection is predominantly caused by bacteria. Symptoms include the strong and frequent sensation or urge to urinate, pain during urination, and urine that is cloudy. The most frequent cause is Escherichia coli. Urine is typically sterile but contains a variety of salts, and waste products. Bacteria can ascend into the bladder or kidney and causing cystitis and nephritis.
 Bacterial gastroenteritis is caused by enteric, pathogenic bacteria. These pathogenic species are usually distinct from the usually harmless bacteria of the normal gut flora. But a different strain of the same species may be pathogenic. The distinction is sometimes difficult as in the case of Escherichia.
 Bacterial skin infections include:
 Impetigo is a highly contagious bacterial skin infection commonly seen in children. It is caused by Staphylococcus aureus, and Streptococcus pyogenes.
 Erysipelas is an acute streptococcus bacterial infection of the deeper skin layers that spreads via with lymphatic system.
 Cellulitis is a diffuse inflammation of connective tissue with severe inflammation of dermal and subcutaneous layers of the skin. Cellulitis can be caused by normal skin flora or by contagious contact, and usually occurs through open skin, cuts, blisters, cracks in the skin, insect bites, animal bites, burns, surgical wounds, intravenous drug injection, or sites of intravenous catheter insertion. In most cases it is the skin on the face or lower legs that is affected, though cellulitis can occur in other tissues.

Mechanisms of damage
The symptoms of disease appear as pathogenic bacteria damage host tissues or interfere with their function. The bacteria can damage host cells directly or indirectly by provoking an immune response that inadvertently damages host cells, or by releasing  toxins.

Direct
Once pathogens attach to host cells, they can cause direct damage as the pathogens use the host cell for nutrients and produce waste products. For example, Streptococcus mutans, a component of dental plaque, metabolizes dietary sugar and produces acid as a waste product.  The acid decalcifies the tooth surface to cause dental caries.

Toxin production

Endotoxins are the lipid portions of lipopolysaccharides that are part of the outer membrane of the cell wall of gram-negative bacteria. Endotoxins are released when the bacteria lyses, which is why after antibiotic treatment, symptoms can worsen at first as the bacteria are killed and they release their endotoxins. Exotoxins are secreted into the surrounding medium or released when the bacteria die and the cell wall breaks apart.

Indirect
An excessive or inappropriate immune response triggered by an infection may damage host cells.

Survival in host

Nutrients
Iron is required for humans, as well as the growth of most bacteria. To obtain free iron, some pathogens secrete proteins called siderophores, which take the iron away from iron-transport proteins by binding to the iron even more tightly. Once the iron-siderophore complex is formed, it is taken up by siderophore receptors on the bacterial surface and then that iron is brought into the bacterium.

Bacterial pathogens also require access to carbon and energy sources for growth. To avoid competition with host cells for glucose which is the main energy source used by human cells, many pathogens including the respiratory pathogen Haemophilus influenzae specialise in using other carbon sources such as lactate that are abundant in the human body

Identification
Typically identification is done by growing the organism in a wide range of cultures which can take up to 48 hours. The growth is then visually or genomically identified. The cultured organism is then subjected to various assays to observe reactions to help further identify species and strain.

Treatment

Bacterial infections may be treated with antibiotics, which are classified as bacteriocidal if they kill bacteria or bacteriostatic if they just prevent bacterial growth. There are many types of antibiotics and each class inhibits a process that is different in the pathogen from that found in the host. For example, the antibiotics chloramphenicol and tetracyclin inhibit the bacterial ribosome but not the structurally different eukaryotic ribosome, so they exhibit selective toxicity. Antibiotics are used both in treating human disease and in intensive farming to promote animal growth. Both uses may be contributing to the rapid development of antibiotic resistance in bacterial populations. Phage therapy, using bacteriophages can also be used to treat certain bacterial infections.

Prevention
Infections can be prevented by antiseptic measures such as sterilizing the skin prior to piercing it with the needle of a syringe and by proper care of indwelling catheters. Surgical and dental instruments are also sterilized to prevent infection by bacteria. Disinfectants such as bleach are used to kill bacteria or other pathogens on surfaces to prevent contamination and further reduce the risk of infection. Bacteria in food are killed by cooking to temperatures above 73 °C (163 °F).

List of genera and microscopy features
Many genera contain pathogenic bacterial species. They often possess characteristics that help to classify and organize them into groups. The following is a partial listing.

List of species and clinical characteristics

This is description of the more common genera and species presented with their clinical characteristics and treatments.

Genetic transformation

Of the 59 species listed in the table with their clinical characteristics, 11 species (or 19%) are known to be capable of natural genetic transformation.  Natural transformation is a bacterial adaptation for transferring DNA from one cell to another.  This process includes the uptake of exogenous DNA from a donor cell by a recipient cell and its incorporation into the recipient cell's genome by recombination.  Transformation appears to be an adaptation for repairing damage in the recipient cell's DNA.  Among pathogenic bacteria, transformation capability likely serves as an adaptation that facilitates survival and infectivity.  The pathogenic bacteria able to carry out natural genetic transformation (of those listed in the table) are Campylobacter jejuni, Enterococcus faecalis, Haemophilus influenzae, Helicobacter pylori, Klebsiella pneumoniae, Legionella pneumophila, Neisseria gonorrhoeae, Neisseria meningitidis, Staphylococcus aureus, Streptococcus pneumoniae and Vibrio cholerae.

See also
 Human microbiome project
 List of antibiotics
 Pathogenic viruses

Notes

References

External links

 Bacterial Pathogen Pronunciation by Neal R. Chamberlain, Ph.D. at A.T. Still University
 Pathogenic bacteria genomes and related information at PATRIC, a Bioinformatics Resource Center funded by NIAID

 
Bacterial diseases